Martin Groth (born 20 October 1969 in Hanover) is a German former professional footballer who played as a midfielder.

References

Honours
Hannover 96
 DFB-Pokal: 1991–92

1969 births
Living people
German footballers
Association football midfielders
Hannover 96 players
FC Hansa Rostock players
Hamburger SV players
VfB Lübeck players
Bundesliga players
2. Bundesliga players
Footballers from Hanover